Cambarus chasmodactylus, commonly called the New River Crayfish, is a species of crayfish endemic to the New River drainage system

References

Cambaridae
Crustaceans described in 1966